Fire Dances is the fourth studio album by English post-punk band Killing Joke, released in July 1983 by E.G. via Polydor Records. It was the band's first album to feature new bass player Paul Raven, recorded at Basing Street Studios in London between February and March 1983. According to Paul Ferguson the band's drug use contributed to the original mix of the album being "tinny".

Release 

Fire Dances was released in July 1983 by E.G. Records. It entered number 29 in the UK Albums Chart, on 23 July 1983.

The album was remastered and reissued in 2008, with eight bonus tracks: the non-album single "Me or You?", an alternate version of "Dominator" (B-side to "Let's All Go (to the Fire Dances)"), an unreleased early version of "The Gathering" and four tracks from a John Peel session from 1983.

Reception 

Fire Dances was generally well received by music critics. NME called it "their best [album] yet, and also likely to be their biggest." PopMatters and Trouser Press both qualified the album as "superb", with the latter describing the album's mood as "brighter" and "more joyous" than previous records.

Track listing

Personnel 
 Killing Joke
 Jaz Coleman – vocals, synthesizer, production
 Kevin "Geordie" Walker – guitar, production
 Paul Raven – bass guitar, production
 Paul Ferguson – drums, vocals, production

 Technical
 John Porter – co-producer on "Let's All Go (to the Fire Dances)", "Me or You" and "Wilful Days"
 Nigel Mills - recording engineer, mixing

Charts

References

External links 

 

1983 albums
Killing Joke albums
albums produced by John Porter (musician)
E.G. Records albums
Post-punk albums by English artists